The Battle of Vác was fought on June 27, 1684, near the city of Vác in central Hungary, between the forces of the Ottoman Empire, and the forces of the Holy Roman Empire as part of the Great Turkish War. The Austrian army was victorious.

References

Bibliography 

 
 

Battles of the Great Turkish War
Battles involving the Ottoman Empire
Battles involving the Holy Roman Empire
Conflicts in 1684
1684 in Europe
Vác